Matthew David Koch (born November 2, 1990) is an American professional baseball pitcher in the Colorado Rockies organization. He previously played in MLB for the Arizona Diamondbacks and Seattle Mariners, and for the Tokyo Yakult Swallows of Nippon Professional Baseball (NPB).

Career

Amateur career
Koch attended Washington High School in Cherokee, Iowa, and played for the school's baseball team. The Boston Red Sox selected Koch in the 37th round of the 2009 MLB draft. He did not sign and attended the University of Louisville, where he played college baseball for the Louisville Cardinals.

In 2011, he played collegiate summer baseball for the Chatham A's of the Cape Cod Baseball League and was named a league all-star.

New York Mets
Koch was drafted by the New York Mets in the third round of the 2012 MLB draft. He made his professional debut with the Low-A Brooklyn Cyclones, and recorded a 5.01 ERA in 13 games for the club. In 2013, Koch pitched for the Single-A Savannah Sand Gnats, registering a 6-4 record and 4.70 ERA with 68 strikeouts. In 2014, Koch spent the season with the High-A St. Lucie Mets, pitching to a 10-4 record and 4.64 ERA in 120.1 innings of work. He began the 2015 season with the Double-A Binghamton Mets, recording a 4-8 record and 3.46 ERA in 35 appearances.

Arizona Diamondbacks
On August 30, 2015 the Mets traded Koch and Miller Diaz to the Arizona Diamondbacks for Addison Reed. The Diamondbacks added him to their 40-man roster after the season.

Koch was promoted to the Major Leagues for September call ups in 2016. In 7 games for the D'Backs, he was 1–1 with 1 save. The following season he pitched the whole season at Reno (AAA).

In 2018, he began the season in AAA but after an injury to the Diamondbacks rotation, Koch was called up. In his first 6 starts, he was 2–1 with an ERA under 3 but struggled afterwards, leading to his demotion to AAA with the return of Shelby Miller. On June 20, he was demoted to AAA for a second time. On the season, Koch finished with a 5–5 record with an ERA of 4.15 in 19 games, 14 starts.

On April 28, 2019, Koch was designated for assignment by the Diamondbacks after recording a 9.15 ERA and 3.92 K/9 in 20.0 innings pitched. On May 4, Koch was outrighted to the Triple-A Reno Aces. He finished the year in Reno, recording a 5-10 record and 7.38 ERA before electing free agency on November 7, 2019.

Tokyo Yakult Swallows
On December 13, 2019, Koch signed a one year deal with the Tokyo Yakult Swallows of Nippon Professional Baseball (NPB). On January 31, 2020, he held press conference with Gabriel Ynoa and Alcides Escobar. On August 22, 2020, Koch made his NPB debut. Koch recorded an 0-3 record and 7.88 ERA with 6 strikeouts in 7 games for the Swallows. On December 2, 2020, he became a free agent.

Cleveland Indians
On April 23, 2021, Koch signed a minor league contract with the Cleveland Indians organization. He elected free agency on November 7, 2021.

Seattle Mariners
On March 10, 2022, Koch signed a minor league contract with the Seattle Mariners. He had his contract selected from Triple-A on April 13, 2022. He was designated for assignment on April 29, 2022. On May 5, he cleared waivers and was sent outright to the Triple-A Tacoma Rainiers. On October 13, Koch elected free agency.

Colorado Rockies
On November 29, 2022, Koch signed a minor league contract with the Colorado Rockies.

References

External links

1990 births
Living people
American expatriate baseball players in Japan
Arizona Diamondbacks players
Baseball players from Iowa
Binghamton Mets players
Brooklyn Cyclones players
Chatham Anglers players
Hillsboro Hops players
Louisville Cardinals baseball players
Major League Baseball pitchers
Mobile BayBears players
Nippon Professional Baseball pitchers
People from Storm Lake, Iowa
Reno Aces players
Savannah Sand Gnats players
Seattle Mariners players
St. Lucie Mets players
Tigres del Licey players
Tacoma Rainiers players
American expatriate baseball players in the Dominican Republic
Tokyo Yakult Swallows players